Marley's Ghosts is a British television sitcom which premiered on 30 September 2015 on Gold. The series revolves around magistrate Marley Wise (Sarah Alexander) who is able to see and talk with a trio of ghosts comprising her husband (John Hannah), her lover (Nicholas Burns), and the local vicar (Jo Joyner).

The second series aired on Gold in October and November 2016.

Cast and characters
 Sarah Alexander as Marley Wise
 Jo Joyner as Vicar
 Nicholas Burns as Michael Walton, Marley's lover
 John Hannah as Adam Wise, Marley's husband
 Mina Anwar as Tina Jarvis (Series 1)

Episodes

Series 1 (2015)

Series 2 (2016)

References

External links 
 
 
 

2015 British television series debuts
2016 British television series endings
2010s British sitcoms
Adultery in television
British fantasy television series
British supernatural television shows
English-language television shows
Gold (British TV channel) original programming
Television series about ghosts
Television series about widowhood
Television series by All3Media